Kale Kessy (born December 4, 1992) is a Canadian professional ice hockey left winger currently playing for the Colorado Eagles of the American Hockey League (AHL). He was originally drafted in the fourth round, 111th overall, by the Phoenix Coyotes in the 2011 NHL Entry Draft.

Early life
Kessy was born on December 4, 1992, in Shaunavon, Saskatchewan. His cousin Jennifer Kessy was a silver medalist for the United States in beach volleyball at the 2012 Summer Olympics.

Playing career
Although Kessy was born in Shaunavon, Saskatchewan, he moved to Swift Current for a couple of years and played peewee hockey. He eventually moved to Medicine Hat at the age of 12 to play bantam and midget hockey. While in Medicine Hat, he attended Notre Dame Academy.

Major junior
Kessy joined the Medicine Hat Tigers of the Western Hockey League (WHL) for nine games during their 2008–09 season, seeing limited ice time in nine games. He rejoined the team for their 2009–10 season and recorded his first major junior goal on September 18, 2009. He stayed with the team for the remainder of their season and scored 11 goals and 18 assists in 70 games while also leading the team in penalty minutes. During the 2010–11 season, Kessy recorded 10 goals and 24 points in 65 games to help the Tigers reach the league semifinals. While his offensive output dipped from the previous season, he recorded three goals and six points in 14 post-season games. Leading up to the 2011 NHL Entry Draft, Kessy was ranked 101st amongst North American skaters by the NHL Central Scouting Bureau. He was eventually drafted in the fourth round, 111th overall, by the Phoenix Coyotes, which he described as "a great honour."

During the 2012 offseason, Kessy improved his training by specifically focusing on his shooting and stick handling. He credited his Medicine Hat linemates Colin Smith and Chase Souto for "helping me reach my potential."  On October 1, 2012, Kessy was handed a 12 game suspension for checking the head of Lethbridge Hurricanes defenseman Ryan Pilon during a game. While serving the suspension, he was traded to the Vancouver Giants who wished to add toughness to their lineup. His suspension was later reduced by two games and he joined the Giants lineup on October 26 against the Victoria Royals. Upon returning, Kessy said "I'm definitely going to be the most watched guy in the league...I'm definitely going to have to be more careful."

On March 29, 2013, Kessy's playing rights were traded to the Edmonton Oilers in exchange for Tobias Rieder. At the time of the trade, he had scored 43 points in 60 games split between the Kamloops Blazers and Vancouver Giants.  On April 2, Kessy recorded a hat-trick in a 6–2 win over the Victoria Royals to win their first-round 2013 WHL Playoffs series.

Professional

Kessy made his professional debut with the Bakersfield Condors of the ECHL during the 2013–14 season. After playing in 18 games and recording a goal and an assist, he was re-assigned to the Oklahoma City Barons (OKC) in the American Hockey League (AHL). Kessy's progress in the AHL was noticed by the Oilers and coach Todd Nelson described him as being "on the cusp of maybe being an Oilers’ call-up." However, on December 2, 2014, he suffered a season-ending knee injury that required surgery. 

Upon returning to the ice, Kessy spent the entirety of the 2015–16 season with the Condors and recorded. The following season, he joined the Winnipeg Jets organization and signed with their AHL affiliate, the Manitoba Moose. After attending their training camp, he was re-assigned to their ECHL affiliate, the Tulsa Oilers. Kessy signed a professional tryout with the Manitoba Moose after playing 18 games with the Tulsa Oilers in the ECHL. He played 12 games with the Moose before being released from his contract. On September 27, 2018, Kessy signed an ECHL contract with the Idaho Steelheads for the 2018–19 season. He returned to the Moose on another contract in October but was released again from the team after playing in one game. In January, he received two suspensions and fines from the league. During the season, he signed an AHL contract with the Colorado Eagles and played 15 games with them before returning to the ECHL. 

On February 25, 2020, Kessy sustained an injury during a fight against Charlotte Checkers player Derek Sheppard and was admitted into Milton S. Hershey Medical Center for overnight observation. Two months later, he was the recipient of the Hershey's 2019–20 IOA/American Specialty AHL Man of the Year for his contributions to the Hershey community during the season. On September 25, 2020, the Bears announced that they had re-signed Kessy to a one-year, American Hockey League contract. During the 2020–21 season, Kessy registered two goals and four assists while also accumulating a league-leading 115 penalty minutes. As such, he signed a two-year contract extension to remain with the Bears on July 15, 2021.

In his fourth season under contract with the Bears in 2022–23, Kessy made 25 appearances in adding 2 goals. Primarily serving as a depth forward, Kessy was traded by Hershey in a return to the Colorado Eagles in exchange for future considerations on March 8, 2023.

Career statistics

References

External links
 

1992 births
Living people
Bakersfield Condors players
Bakersfield Condors (1998–2015) players
Cleveland Monsters players
Colorado Eagles players
Hershey Bears players
Idaho Steelheads (ECHL) players
Kamloops Blazers players
Manitoba Moose players
Medicine Hat Tigers players
Oklahoma City Barons players
People from Shaunavon, Saskatchewan
Tulsa Oilers (1992–present) players
Vancouver Giants players